Cool Kids is the second studio album by the glam metal band Kix. Released in 1983 on Atlantic Records, it is the only Kix album to feature Brad Divens of Wrathchild America and Souls at Zero on guitar.

Background
Cool Kids reached position No.177 on the Billboard charts. It showcased a slightly more commercial side of the band. In addition, it started the trend of including material written by outside songwriters, which then continued on their following studio albums.

"Body Talk" was the first single to be released off of the album and one of the album's three cover songs. First released as "(She Talks) Body Talk" on the 1981 Body Talk Muzik album by Nick Gilder (earlier of "Hot Child in the City" fame), and co-written by Gilder and his longtime musical associate, Jamie Herndon, this song was believed to have been included on Cool Kids to appease the group's label. The band was also urged to shoot a video for the song, which featured the Kix members cavorting with ladies in full-on workout garb.

The album also included the Spider cover "Burning Love," co-written by Spider's keyboardist Holly Knight - who later became a member of Device and a hit songwriter (incidentally, sometimes co-writing with Gilder) for artists such as Heart and Cheap Trick - and singer Amanda Blue (later of the group Shanghai), along with the title track "Cool Kids," a cover of a Franne Golde song from her 1980 album Restless, co-written by Golde with producer Peter McIan and Billy Steele.

Track listing
All tracks composed by Donnie Purnell, except where noted
Side one
 "Burning Love" (Amanda Blue, Holly Knight) – 3:07
 "Cool Kids" (Franne Golde, Peter McIan, Billy Steele) – 3:28
 "Love Pollution" (Steve Whiteman, Brian Forsythe) – 4:04
 "Body Talk" (Nick Gilder, Jamie Herndon) – 3:39
 "Loco-Emotion" – 3:30

Side two
 "Mighty Mouth" – 3:43
 "Nice on Ice" – 3:25
 "Get Your Monkeys Out" – 3:20
 "For Shame" – 3:11
 "Restless Blood" (Purnell, Whiteman, Forsythe, Jimmy Chalfant, Brad Divens) – 3:50

Personnel
Kix
Steve Whiteman – lead vocals, harmonica, saxophone
Brad Divens – guitars, backing vocals, talk box
Brian "Damage" Forsythe – guitars
Donnie Purnell – bass, backing vocals, keyboards, co-lead vocals on "Body Talk"
Jimmy "Chocolate" Chalfant – drums, backing vocals, percussion, co-lead vocals on "Body Talk"

Production
Peter Solley – producer
Steve Klein – engineer, mixing
Jim Sessody – assistant engineer
Mike Fuller – mastering
Lynn Dreese Breslin – art direction
David Michael Kennedy – photography

References

External links
Kix Official Website
Guitar.com 2014 interview with Kix guitarist Brian Forsythe

1983 albums
Kix (band) albums
Atlantic Records albums